KCWG-LP (100.3 FM) is a radio station licensed to serve Crown King, Arizona.  The station is owned by Bradshaw Mountain Broadcasting Inc. It airs a Classic Country music format. In addition to it usual music programming, the station also airs short programs featuring historical information about the local area and promotes the town of Crown King as "a nice place to camp, fish, hunt, eat and sleep-over."

The station was assigned the KCWG-LP call letters by the Federal Communications Commission on July 22, 2002.

References

External links
 
 KCWG-LP service area per the FCC database

Classic country radio stations in the United States
Gospel radio stations in the United States
CWG-LP
Mass media in Yavapai County, Arizona
CWG-LP